This is a list of electrical phenomena. Electrical phenomena are a somewhat arbitrary division of electromagnetic phenomena.

Some examples are:

Biefeld–Brown effect — Thought by the person who coined the name, Thomas Townsend Brown, to be an anti-gravity effect, it is generally attributed to electrohydrodynamics (EHD) or sometimes electro-fluid-dynamics, a counterpart to the well-known magneto-hydrodynamics.
Bioelectrogenesis — The generation of electricity by living organisms.
Capacitive coupling — Transfer of energy within an electrical network or between distant networks by means of displacement current.
Contact electrification — The phenomenon of electrification by contact. When two objects were touched together, sometimes the objects became spontaneously charged (οne negative charge, one positive charge).
Corona effect — Build-up of charges in a high-voltage conductor (common in AC transmission lines), which ionizes the air and produces visible light, usually purple.
Dielectric polarization — Orientation of charges in certain insulators inside an external static electric field, such as when a charged object is brought close, which produces an electric field inside the insulator.
Direct Current  — (old: Galvanic Current)  or "continuous current"; The continuous flow of electricity through a conductor such as a wire from high to low potential.
Electromagnetic induction — Production of a voltage by a time-varying magnetic flux.
Electroluminescence — The phenomenon wherein a material emits light in response to an electric current passed through it, or to a strong electric field.
Electrostatic induction — Redistribution of charges in a conductor inside an external static electric field, such as when a charged object is brought close.
Electrical conduction — The movement of electrically charged particles through transmission medium.
Electric shock — Physiological reaction of a biological organism to the passage of electric current through its body.
Ferranti effect — A rise in the amplitude of the AC voltage at the receiving end of a transmission line, compared with the sending-end voltage, due to the capacitance between the conductors, when the receiving end is open-circuited.
Ferroelectric effect — The phenomenon whereby certain ionic crystals may exhibit a spontaneous dipole moment.
Hall effect — Separation of charges in a current-carrying conductor inside an external magnetic field, which produces a voltage across the conductor.
Inductance  —  The phenomenon whereby the property of a circuit by which energy is stored in the form of an electromagnetic field.
Induction heating — Heat produced in a conductor when eddy currents pass through it.
Joule heating — Heat produced in a conductor when charges move through it, such as in resistors and wires.
Lightning —  powerful natural electrostatic discharge produced during a thunderstorm. Lightning's abrupt electric discharge is accompanied by the emission of light.
Noise and electromagnetic interference — Unwanted and usually random disturbance in an electrical signal. A Faraday cage can be used to attenuate electromagnetic fields, even to avoid the discharge from a Tesla coil.
Photoconductivity —  The phenomenon in which a material becomes more conductive due to the absorption of electro-magnetic radiation such as visible light, ultraviolet light, or gamma radiation.
Photoelectric effect —  Emission of electrons from a surface (usually metallic) upon exposure to, and absorption of, electromagnetic radiation (such as visible light and ultraviolet radiation).
Photovoltaic effect — Production of a voltage by light exposure.
Piezoelectric effect — Ability of certain crystals to generate a voltage in response to applied mechanical stress.
Plasma — Plasma occur when gas is heated to very high temperatures and it disassociates into positive and negative charges.
Proximity effect — Redistribution of charge flow in a conductor carrying alternating current when there are other nearby current-carrying conductors.
Pyroelectric effect — The potential created in certain materials when they are heated.
Redox  — (short for reduction-oxidation reaction) A chemical reaction in which the oxidation states of atoms are changed. 
Skin effect — Tendency of charges to distribute at the surface of a conductor, when an alternating current passes through it.
Static electricity  —  Class of phenomena involving the imbalanced charge present on an object, typically referring to charge with voltages of sufficient magnitude to produce visible attraction (e.g., static cling), repulsion, and sparks.
Sparks  — Electrical breakdown of a medium that produces an ongoing plasma discharge, similar to the instant spark, resulting from a current flowing through normally nonconductive media such as air.
Telluric currents — Extremely low frequency electric current that occurs naturally over large underground areas at or near the surface of the Earth. 
Thermionic emission — the emission of electrons from a heated electrode, usually the cathode, the principle underlying most vacuum tubes.
Thermoelectric effect — the Seebeck effect, the Peltier effect, and the Thomson effect.
Thunderstorm — also  electrical storm, form of weather characterized by the presence of lightning and its acoustic effect on the Earth's atmosphere known as thunder.
Triboelectric effect — Type of contact electrification in which objects become electrically charged after coming into contact and are then separated. A Van de Graaff generator is based on this principle.
Whistlers — Very low frequency radio wave generated by lightning.

References

External links
A Βeginner's Guide to Natural VLF Radio Phenomena